Joseph Jay Wylie Sr. (born February 10, 1968), is an American retired professional basketball player.  Born in Washington, D.C., he is listed at 6'9" and weighed 210 lbs.  Wylie played collegiate ball with the University of Miami Hurricanes from 1988 to 1991), where he earned the names, "Wylie's World", and "Jumping Joe Wylie", because of his ability to leap over his opponents. Wylie entered the 1991 NBA Draft and was picked 38th in the second round by the Los Angeles Clippers.  On July 4, 1991, almost a week after the draft, the Clippers traded him to the New York Knicks for a 1993 second round pick.  The Knicks were enthusiastic of getting such a player of his calibre;  In 1992, Wylie was invited to the Minnesota Timberwolves training camp but he was eventually cut from the roster during the preseason. In 1993 Wylie played in 6 preseason games with the Detroit Pistons and was the last cut before contracts became guaranteed. He eventually played his professional basketball career mostly overseas in Italy, Spain, France, Venezuela, Puerto Rico, Turkey, Argentina, Israel, Portugal, the Philippines, Germany, Russia, the Dominican Republic and Hungary.  He also played in  CBA with the Columbus Horizon during the 1991–92 season.  He retired in 2009.  Wylie has a son, Joseph Micheal Wylie, Jr., who played collegiate football at his alma mater but later transferred to Tennessee State University.

References

1968 births
Living people
American expatriate basketball people in Argentina
American expatriate basketball people in the Dominican Republic
American expatriate basketball people in France
American expatriate basketball people in Germany
American expatriate basketball people in Hungary
American expatriate basketball people in Israel
American expatriate basketball people in Italy
American expatriate basketball people in the Philippines
American expatriate basketball people in Portugal
American expatriate basketball people in Russia
American expatriate basketball people in Spain
American expatriate basketball people in Turkey
American expatriate basketball people in Venezuela
American men's basketball players
Basket Napoli players
Basket Rimini Crabs players
Basketball players from Washington, D.C.
BC Samara players
Beşiktaş men's basketball players
Bnei Hertzeliya basketball players
CB Guadalajara players
Chorale Roanne Basket players
Columbus Horizon players
Hapoel Holon players
Kaposvári KK players
Leones de Ponce basketball players
Liga ACB players
Los Angeles Clippers draft picks
Miami Hurricanes men's basketball players
Peñarol de Mar del Plata basketball players
Philippine Basketball Association imports
Power forwards (basketball)
Ratiopharm Ulm players
S.L. Benfica basketball players
San Miguel Beermen players
Barangay Ginebra San Miguel players